The Roman Catholic Diocese of Anguo is a diocese located in the city of Anguo in the Ecclesiastical province of Beijing in China.

History
 April 15, 1924: Established as the Apostolic Prefecture of Lixian 蠡縣 from the Apostolic Vicariate of Central Chi-Li 直隸中境 and Apostolic Vicariate of Southwestern Chi-Li 直隸西南
 July 13, 1929: Promoted as Apostolic Vicariate of Anguo 安國
 April 11, 1946: Promoted as Diocese of Anguo 安國

Leadership
 Bishops of Anguo 安國 (Roman rite)
 Bishop John Baptist Wang Zeng-yi, C.M. (April 11, 1946 – February 21, 1951)
 Vicars Apostolic of Anguo 安國 (Roman Rite)
 Bishop John Baptist Wang Zeng-yi, C.M. (July 1, 1937 – April 11, 1946)
 Bishop Melchior Sun De-zhen (Souen), C.M. (June 24, 1926 – 1937)

References
 (for Chronology of Bishops) 
 (for Chronology of Bishops) 

Roman Catholic dioceses in China
Christian organizations established in 1924
Roman Catholic dioceses and prelatures established in the 20th century
Christianity in Hebei
1924 establishments in China